Crassispira sanibelensis, common name the Sanibel turrid, is a species of sea snail, a marine gastropod mollusk in the family Pseudomelatomidae.

Description
The length of the shell attains 29 mm.

Distribution
This marine species occurs off Western Florida (Sanibel Island), USA and off the Bahamas

References

 Bartsch, Paul, and Harald A. Rehder. "New turritid mollusks from Florida." Proceedings of the United States National Museum (1939).

External links
 
 

sanibelensis
Gastropods described in 1939